Merseburg-Querfurt was a district (Kreis) in the south of Saxony-Anhalt, Germany. Neighboring districts were (from northwest clockwise) Sangerhausen, Mansfelder Land, Saalkreis, the district-free city Halle, the districts Delitzsch and Leipziger Land in Saxony, the districts Weißenfels and Burgenlandkreis, and the Kyffhäuserkreis in Thuringia.

History 
The district was created in 1994 by merging the previous districts Merseburg and Querfurt.

Geography 
The main river of the district is the Saale.

Coat of arms

Towns and municipalities

External links 
 Official website (German)

1994 establishments in Germany
Merseburg

ro:Saale (district)